Button Rock School, also known as the Buttin School, and District #85 School, is a historic one-room school building and national historic district located in the Ozark National Scenic Riverways near Eminence, Shannon County, Missouri.  The school was built in 1913, and is a one-story, rectangular frame building on a pier foundation.  It has a gable roof and is sheathed in novelty siding painted white.  Also on the property is a contributing frame privy.

It was listed on the National Register of Historic Places in 1991.

References

One-room schoolhouses in Missouri
Historic districts on the National Register of Historic Places in Missouri
School buildings on the National Register of Historic Places in Missouri
School buildings completed in 1913
Buildings and structures in Shannon County, Missouri
National Register of Historic Places in Shannon County, Missouri
1914 establishments in Missouri